Chris Bailey Jr. (born August 10, 1989) is an American professional stock car racing driver. He has competed in the ARCA Menards Series from 2011 to 2016. Before this, he won the ARCA Truck Series championship in 2010.

Racing career
Bailey Jr.'s first foray into major stock car competition came in 2007 in the NASCAR Whelen All-American Series driving in the Pennsylvania State Championship at Lake Erie Speedway. He also ran two races in the Mid-Atlantic Asphalt Racing Alliance. He would run one year in the All American Series before moving to the ARCA Truck Series for one race in 2009 at Lake Erie, finishing fifth. He would return to the series in 2010, winning the series championship in his first year of full-time competition with two wins at Lorain County Speedway and Skyline Speedway. He would run the full schedule for the next two years, finishing runner-up in points in 2011, and fourth in 2012.

Bailey Jr. would make his ARCA Racing Series debut in the No. 15 Chevrolet for Venturini Motorsports at Winchester Speedway in 2011, finishing 31st and last after completing only one lap due to handling issues. 

After not running in the series the following year, Bailey Jr. would return in 2013, running in eleven races that year, with his first start coming with Wayne Peterson Racing and the rest coming with various Kimmel Racing entries. He would earn a career best finish of 14th at Kentucky Speedway, and would finish 19th in the overall standings. For 2014, he would return with the Kimmel outfit, first running in the season opening race at Daytona International Speedway, finishing 16th, although he would spend the rest of the year in a start and park role in his 12 starts that year (including a start for Carter 2 Motorsports at the third race at Salem Speedway).

Bailey Jr. would run only five races for Kimmel Racing in 2015, with a best finish of 19th at Talladega Superspeedway. He would move over to Max Force Racing for 10 of the 20 races for 2016, coming with a season best result at the season finale at Kansas Speedway, where he would finish 16th. For 2017, Jent Motorsports announced that they would partner with Bailey Jr. for the full season, although they would not run a race that season. He has not competed in the series since.

Motorsports results

ARCA Racing Series
(key) (Bold – Pole position awarded by qualifying time. Italics – Pole position earned by points standings or practice time. * – Most laps led.)

References

1989 births
Living people
NASCAR drivers
ARCA Menards Series drivers
Racing drivers from Pennsylvania
Racing drivers from Pittsburgh
People from Allegheny County, Pennsylvania